The Lagos State Ferry Services Corporation (LSFSC) or Lagos Ferry Services Company (also known as Lagferry) is a ferry services provider in Lagos State. It was established in 1983. 

Lagferry works in conjunction with Lagos State Waterways Authority (LASWA), National Inland Waterways Authority (NIWA) and Nigeria Maritime Administration and Safety Agency (NIMASA). Besides Lagferry, other private ferry operators also use modern ferry boats to provide commercial transport services between Ikorodu, Lagos Island, Apapa and Victoria Island.

References

External links

Ferry transport in Lagos
1983 establishments in Nigeria
Ferry companies of Lagos
Companies based in Lagos
Public transport in Lagos